Steve Neal (1949 in Coos Bay, Oregon – February 18, 2004, in Hinsdale, Illinois) was an American journalist and historian, noted for political columns and coverage of American electoral history.  He is best known for Dark Horse, an authorized biography of 1940 presidential candidate Wendell Willkie.

Biography

Journalist
After studying at the University of Oregon and Columbia University, Neal served as a bylined reporter and columnist for the Oregon Journal, the Philadelphia Inquirer and the Chicago Tribune, rising to the level of White House correspondent for the Tribune.  From 1987 until 2004, he worked with the Chicago Sun-Times, writing a frequent political column for their editorial page.  In 1999, a collection of Neal's columns, Rolling on the River, was published by the Southern Illinois University Press.

Historian
 
Neal published biographies and biographical material on Dwight D. Eisenhower, Oregon Gov. Tom McCall, and 1940 presidential candidate Wendell Willkie; he also edited collections of the letters and speeches of Harry S. Truman.  His hero, however, was Abraham Lincoln, and he campaigned for public support to transfer Lincoln's papers and memorabilia to a scholarly, nonpolitical library and museum that would serve as a focus for public education of the life of the 16th President of the United States.

Death and honors
Neal was found dead at his Hinsdale home on February 18, 2004, after having inhaled a fatal quantity of carbon monoxide.  The Abraham Lincoln Presidential Library and Museum, located in Springfield, Illinois, opened to the public in 2005.  The library has named its reading room the Steve Neal Reading Room in honor of Neal's work and advocacy for the creation of the library.

References

External links

1949 births
2004 deaths
American male journalists
20th-century American journalists
Chicago Tribune people
Chicago Sun-Times people
American political writers
20th-century American historians
20th-century American male writers
People from Hinsdale, Illinois
People from Coos Bay, Oregon
University of Oregon alumni
Columbia University alumni
Historians from Illinois
American male non-fiction writers